Rebel Music is a compilation album by Bob Marley & The Wailers released by Island Records in 1986. It consists of tracks drawn from such albums as Catch A Fire,  Natty Dread, Live!, Rastaman Vibration, Babylon By Bus, and Survival, as well as an exclusive remix of "Rebel Music (3 O'Clock Roadblock)" and the first album appearance of 1977 B Side "Roots". The album includes the hit singles "So Much Trouble in the World", "War / No More Trouble", and "Get Up, Stand Up". Some of the vinyl pressings include a looping sound at the end groove of side A, apparently the noise at the ending of Bob Marley & The Wailers's "Satisfy My Soul", released 1978 on the album Kaya by Tuff Gong/Island. The remastered edition of the CD features "Wake Up And Live (Parts 1&2)" as a bonus track. Both parts had previously appeared on either side of a rare single in 1979, here they are mixed together to form one track.

Track listing

Original album (1986)

The Definitive Remasters edition (2002)

Certifications

References

1986 greatest hits albums
Bob Marley and the Wailers compilation albums
Albums produced by Chris Blackwell
Albums produced by Alex Sadkin
Island Records compilation albums
Tuff Gong albums